This is a list of all GWR Modified Hall class locomotives built at Swindon Works by the Great Western Railway and British Railways.

Notes
 Locomotives 6959–6970 were built without names, receiving their names in 1946 and 1947.
 Locomotive 6998 was sold direct to the Great Western Society, Didcot. All other preserved locomotives were originally sold as scrap to Woodham Brothers, Barry.

References

See also
Preserved GWR Modified Hall Class locomotives

 List of 6959 class
Gwr 6959 Class Locomotives